HMS Grasshopper was a  (or G-class) destroyer of the British Royal Navy. Grasshopper was built by Fairfield Shipbuilding & Engineering Company at their Govan yard, between 1909 and 1910, being launched on 23 November 1909 and completing in July 1910.

Grasshopper was transferred to the Mediterranean Fleet in 1913, and spent most of the First World War in the Mediterranean, taking part in the Gallipoli campaign, before returning to British waters in 1917. She was sold for scrap in November 1921.

Construction and design
Grasshopper was one of three s ordered from Fairfield Shipbuilding and Engineering Company as part of the 1908–1909 shipbuilding programme. The Beagles were not built to a standard design, with detailed design being left to the builders of individual ships in accordance with a loose specification.

Displacement was  normal. Five Yarrow boilers fed direct-drive Parsons steam turbines driving three propeller shafts. Gun armament consisted of one BL 4 inch naval gun Mk VIII and three QF 12-pounder 12 cwt guns. Torpedo armament consisted of two 21 inch (533 mm) torpedo tubes. Two spare torpedoes were carried. The ship had a crew of 96 officers and men.

Grasshopper was laid down at Fairfield Shipbuilding and Engineering Company's Govan, Glasgow shipyard as Yard number 464 on 17 April 1909 and was launched on 23 November 1909. She reached a speed of  during sea trials, and was completed in July 1910.

Service
The Beagles joined the 1st and 2nd Destroyer Flotillas as they commissioned, with Grasshopper being a member of the 1st Flotilla. She was refitted at Chatham Dockyard in July–September 1911. In 1912, a reorganisation of the Home Fleet resulted in the Beagles forming the 3rd Destroyer Flotilla. Grasshopper remained part of the 3rd Flotilla in March 1913. In October 1913, the Beagles, including Grasshopper, were moved to the Mediterranean as the newly formed 5th Destroyer Flotilla.

Grasshopper remained part of the 5th Flotilla on the eve of the outbreak of the First World War. The attempts to intercept Goeben and Breslau failed, and the two German ships reached Turkey on 10 August.

In 1915 she took part in the naval operations in the Dardanelles Campaign. The force came under heavy fire from Turkish guns, and were forced to turn back before reaching the minefields. Continued attempts to clear the minefields ay night proved unsuccessful, and it was decided to clear the minefields by day while the British and French battleships suppressed the Turkish guns that protected the minefields. This was attempted on 18 March, with Grasshopper, Basilisk, Mosquito and Racoon again escorting the minesweeping trawlers.

On 25 April, Allied forces landed at Anzac Cove and Cape Helles on the Gallipoli peninsula. The British made another attempt to break the stalemate at Gallipoli on 6–7 August 1915, with the Landing at Suvla Bay, to the north of Anzac Cove. The troops were landed using armoured shallow-draught self-propelled landing craft known as "Beetles", which were towed close to shore by destroyers. Grasshopper took part in the main landingon Nibrunesi beach to the south of Sulva Bay, where two brigades (the 32nd and 33rd of the 11th Division) were landed. Each destroyer carried 500 troops aboard, while towing a "Beetle" carrying a further 500 troops. The "Beetles" landed their troops and then returned to pick up the remaining troops on the destroyers and land them. Grasshopper took part in the final evacuations from Gallipoli on 8/9 January 1916, picking up troops from V beach on Cape Helles.

Grasshopper was still based in the Mediterranean in August 1917, but by September had returned to Home waters, joining the 4th Destroyer Flotilla, based at Devonport, Plymouth. By October that year, she had moved to the 2nd Destroyer Flotilla, based at Buncrana in the north of Ireland. Grasshopper was one of three destroyers detached from the convoy to rescue survivors from the sinking troopship and rescued about 500 men, while  rescued about 800 and Mosquito about 200. 166 American soldiers and 44 members of Tuscanias crew were killed. Grasshopper was still part of the 2nd Flotilla in May 1918, but by July had returned to the 4th Flotilla at Devonport. She remained at Devonport at the end of the war in November 1918.

At the end of the war, all pre-war destroyers were quickly withdrawn from active service. By January 1919, Grasshopper was still at Devonport having left the 4th Flotilla, and by February had moved to The Nore. She was sold for scrap on 1 November 1921 to Fryer of Sunderland.

Pennant numbers

References

Notes

Bibliography

 
 

 

 
 

 

Beagle-class destroyers
Ships built in Govan
1909 ships
World War I destroyers of the United Kingdom